COGnitive Gaming was a professional esports team based in the United States. They had teams in Smite, League of Legends, Super Smash Bros. Melee, and Heroes of the Storm.

COGnitive Prime won the first Smite World Championship.

COGnitive sponsored Super Smash Bros. Melee players Jason "Mew2King" Zimmerman and Justin "Wizzrobe" Hallett. COGnitive also signed David "Dacidbro" Broweleit for Guilty Gear Xrd.

COG's League team competed in the League of Legends Challenger Series North America, the second highest level of LoL play after the League of Legends Championship Series North America.

Glaurung and Hospital left the HotS team on December 24, 2015.

On December 12, COGnitive announced that they will be ceasing operations on December 31, 2016, shortly after Super Smash Bros. Melee player, Justin "Wizzrobe" Hallett confirmed to ESPN via Daniel "Tafokints" Lee that he would not be renewing his contract with the team.

Fighting game roster

Former

References

Esports teams based in the United States
Defunct and inactive fighting game player sponsors
Defunct and inactive Super Smash Bros. player sponsors
Defunct and inactive Smite (video game) teams
Defunct and inactive League of Legends teams
 
2016 disestablishments in California
2013 establishments in California
Esports teams established in 2013
Esports teams disestablished in 2016